"Steam" is a song written by Lewis Anderson and Bob Regan, and recorded by American country music artist Ty Herndon. It was released in August 1999 as the lead single and title track from his album Steam.  The song reached number 18 on the Billboard Hot Country Singles & Tracks chart and peaked at number 19 on the Canadian RPM Country Tracks chart.

Background
Herndon told Billboard that he originally had doubts about the song. "That is so not me, I'm so used to doing songs with a message to them. [Anthony Martin] told me, 'Well you're going to have to take a step back and make it you.'" He went on call the song "one of those you put in your car CD player and let the windows down, it makes you feel alive and feel good. Sometimes you've got to just have a little fun."

Music video
The music video was directed by Steven Goldmann and premiered in mid-1999.

Chart performance
"Steam" debuted at number 63 on the U.S. Billboard Hot Country Singles & Tracks chart for the week of August 21, 1999.

References

1999 singles
Ty Herndon songs
Songs written by Bob Regan
Epic Records singles
Music videos directed by Steven Goldmann
Songs written by Lewis Anderson
1999 songs